Homalomena is a genus of flowering plants in the family Araceae. Homalomena are found in southern Asia and the southwestern Pacific. Many Homalomena have a strong smell of anise.

The plants of this genus are clump-forming evergreen perennials with mainly heart-shaped or arrowheaded shaped leaves. The flowers are tiny and without petals, enclosed in a usually greenish spathe hidden by the leaves.

Some authors have proposed splitting the genus and moving all the  neotropical species of Homalomena to Adelonema.

Species
Homalomena adiensis A.Hay - western New Guinea
Homalomena aeneifolia Alderw. - Sulawesi
Homalomena agens Kurniawan & P.C.Boyce - Kalimantan Timur
Homalomena ardua P.C.Boyce & S.Y.Wong - Sarawak
Homalomena argentea Ridl. - Peninsular Malaysia, Borneo
Homalomena aromatica (Spreng.) Schott - Yunnan, Assam, Bangladesh, Indochina
Homalomena asmae Baharuddin & P.C.Boyce - Perak
Homalomena asperifolia Alderw. - Sumatra
Homalomena atroviridis Engl. & K.Krause - Papua New Guinea
Homalomena atrox P.C.Boyce, S.Y.Wong & Fasih - Sarawak
Homalomena batoeensis Engl. - Sumatra
Homalomena bellula Schott - Java
Homalomena burkilliana Ridl. - Sumatra
Homalomena clandestina P.C.Boyce, S.Y.Wong & Fasih. - Sarawak
Homalomena cochinchinensis Engl. - Cambodia, Laos, Vietnam, Yunnan, Guangdong
Homalomena confusa Furtado - Peninsular Malaysia
Homalomena consobrina (Schott) Engl. - Thailand, Borneo, Sumatra
Homalomena cordata Schott  - Java, Andaman and Nicobar Islands
Homalomena corneri Furtado - Jahore
Homalomena cristata Alderw. - Sumatra
Homalomena curtisii Ridl. - Perak
Homalomena curvata Engl. - Melaka
Homalomena davidiana A.Hay - New Guinea
Homalomena debilicrista Y.C.Hoe - Sarawak
Homalomena distans Ridl. - New Guinea
Homalomena doctersii Alderw. - Sumatra
Homalomena elegans Engl. - Sumatra
Homalomena elegantula A.Hay & Hersc. - Sumatra
Homalomena expedita A.Hay & Hersc. - Sarawak
Homalomena gadutensis M.Hotta - Sumatra
Homalomena gaudichaudii Schott - New Guinea, Maluku, Philippines
Homalomena giamensis L.S.Tung, S.Y.Wong & P.C.Boyce - Sarawak
Homalomena gillii Furtado - Sabah
Homalomena griffithii (Schott) Hook.f. - Andaman & Nicobar Islands, Thailand, Vietnam, Borneo, Malaysia, Sumatra
Homalomena hainanensis H.Li - Hainan
Homalomena hanneae P.C.Boyce, S.Y.Wong & Fasih. - Sarawak
Homalomena hastata M.Hotta - Sumatra
Homalomena havilandii Ridl. - Sabah, Sarawak
Homalomena hendersonii Furtado - Kelantan
Homalomena hooglandii A.Hay - New Guinea
Homalomena humilis (Jack) Hook.f. - Thailand, Malaysia, Borneo, Java, Sulawesi, Sumatra 
Homalomena impudica Hersc. & A.Hay - Papua New Guinea
Homalomena insignis N.E.Br. - Borneo
Homalomena jacobsiana A.Hay - Papua New Guinea
Homalomena josefii P.C.Boyce & S.Y.Wong - Sarawak
Homalomena kalkmanii A.Hay - New Guinea
Homalomena kelungensis Hayata - Taiwan
Homalomena kiahii Furtado - Kelantan
Homalomena korthalsii Furtado - Borneo
Homalomena kualakohensis Zulhazman, P.C.Boyce & Mashhor - Peninsular Malaysia
Homalomena lancea Ridl. - Sarawak
Homalomena lancifolia Hook.f. - Peninsular Malaysia, Thailand
Homalomena latifrons Engl. - Borneo, Java, Sumatra
Homalomena lauterbachii Engl.  - New Guinea
Homalomena lindenii (Rodigas) Ridl. - New Guinea
Homalomena longipes Merr - Sumatra
Homalomena magna A.Hay - Papua New Guinea
Homalomena major Griff. - Peninsular Malaysia
Homalomena matangae Y.C.Hoe, S.Y.Wong & P.C.Boyce - Sarawak
Homalomena megalophylla M.Hotta - Sumatra
Homalomena melanesica A.Hay - Bismarck Archipelago, Solomon Islands
Homalomena metallica (N.E.Br.) Engl. - Borneo
Homalomena minor Griff. - Peninsular Malaysia
Homalomena minutissima M.Hotta - Brunei
Homalomena monandra M.Hotta - Sumatra
Homalomena montana Furtado - Peninsular Malaysia
Homalomena nigrescens (Schott) Engl. - Sumatra
Homalomena nutans Hook.f. - Kelantan, Nicobar Islands
Homalomena obovata Ridl. - Sumatra
Homalomena obscurifolia Alderw. - Borneo
Homalomena occulta (Lour.) Schott - Laos, Thailand, Vietnam, Guangdong, Guangxi, Hainan, Yunnan 
Homalomena ovalifolia (Schott) Ridl. - Borneo
Homalomena ovata Engl. - Borneo
Homalomena padangensis M.Hotta - Sumatra
Homalomena palawanensis Engl. - Palawan
Homalomena peekelii Engl. - Bismarck Archipelago, Solomon Islands, New Guinea
Homalomena pendula (Blume) Bakh.f. - Bangladesh, Myanmar, Thailand, Borneo, Java, Sumatra, Lesser Sunda Islands 
Homalomena philippinensis Engl. - Philippines, Lan Yü Islands of Taiwan
Homalomena pineodora Sulaiman & P.C.Boyce - Perak
Homalomena pontederifolia Griff. ex Hook.f. - Thailand, Peninsular Malaysia
Homalomena producta A.Hay - New Guinea
Homalomena pseudogeniculata P.C.Boyce & S.Y.Wong - Brunei, Sarawak
Homalomena pulleana Engl. & K.Krause - western New Guinea
Homalomena punctulata Engl. - Brunei, Sarawak
Homalomena pyrospatha Bogner - Sumatra
Homalomena robusta Engl. & K.Krause - New Guinea
Homalomena rubescens (Roxb.) Kunth. - Sikkim, Bhutan, Assam, Arunachal Pradesh, Myanmar
Homalomena rusdii M.Hotta - Sumatra
Homalomena sarawakensis Ridl. - Sarawak
Homalomena saxorum (Schott) Engl. - Sumatra, Borneo
Homalomena schlechteri Engl. - New Guinea
Homalomena scortechinii Hook.f. - Peninsular Malaysia
Homalomena sengkenyang P.C.Boyce, S.Y.Wong & Fasih. - Sarawak
Homalomena silvatica Alderw. - Sumatra
Homalomena singaporensis Regel - Peninsular Malaysia
Homalomena soniae A.Hay - New Guinea
Homalomena steenisiana A.Hay - Papua New Guinea
Homalomena stollei Engl. & K.Krause - New Guinea
Homalomena striatieopetiolata P.C.Boyce & S.Y.Wong - Sarawak
Homalomena subcordata Engl. - Sarawak
Homalomena symplocarpifolia P.C.Boyce, S.Y.Wong & Fasih. - Sarawak
Homalomena tenuispadix Engl. - New Guinea
Homalomena terajaensis S.Y.Wong & P.C.Boyce - Brunei
Homalomena treubii Engl. - Borneo
Homalomena truncata (Schott) Hook.f. - Myanmar, Thailand, Peninsular Malaysia
Homalomena vagans P.C.Boyce - Brunei, Sarawak
Homalomena vietnamensis Bogner & V.D.Nguyen - Vietnam
Homalomena vittifolia Kurniawan & P.C.Boyce - Sulawesi
Homalomena vivens P.C.Boyce, S.Y.Wong & Fasih. - Sarawak
Homalomena wallichii Schott - Pulau Pinang in Malaysia
Homalomena wongii S.Y.Wong & P.C.Boyce - Brunei
Homalomena zollingeri Schott - Java

See also
Schismatoglottis

References

External links
Asiatica plant catalogue 

Aroideae
Araceae genera